Dhaniakhali Saree is a cotton saree made in Dhaniakhali, West Bengal, India. It is a saree with 100 by 100 cotton thread count, borders between 1.5 and 2 inches and six metre long drape.

See also
Ilkal saree
Navalgund Durries

References

Saris
Culture of West Bengal
Geographical indications in West Bengal
Hooghly district
Cotton industry in India